The Ashburn Volunteer Fire and Rescue Department (AVFRD) is a volunteer fire and rescue department located in Ashburn, VA.  AVFRD is a part of the Loudoun County Fire and Rescue Department, a combination volunteer/career department in Loudoun County, Virginia.  AVFRD provides fire suppression, rescue and emergency medical services (EMS) to their constituents.

Stations 
Ashburn Volunteer Fire and Rescue Department staffs two stations.

Station 6 
AVFRD Station 6 is located on Ashburn Road in Ashburn, VA.  The station was originally built in 1946.  The land and the building are wholly owned by the volunteer fire company.

In 2014 the original station was demolished and a new station constructed on the same land.

Station 22 
The Lansdowne Public Safety Station 22 is owned by Loudoun County.  County career personnel staff the station from 6:00 am – 6:00 pm.  Ashburn Volunteer personnel staff the station from 6:00PM – 6:00AM.  A LCFR safety officer (Safety 600) is on-duty at Station 22 on a 24/7 basis.

Apparatus 

In 2017, the department took delivery of a new Tiller equipped with a 100-foot mid-mount aerial ladder and hydraulic extrication tools, and is in the process of replacing its old engines with new models.

As of November 2017, stations 6 and 22 each have 2 new engines, designated E606, E606B, E622, and E622B.

Staffing 

AVFRD staffs stations 6 and 22 from 6 pm to 6 am each night, and LCFR staffs the stations from 6 am to 6 pm.

References

External links 

Government in Loudoun County, Virginia
Fire departments in Virginia